"Candy Rain" is the title of a number-one R&B hit single by Soul for Real, released in 1994 on Uptown Records. The song was written by Ali Shaheed Muhammad, Hamish Stuart, Dwight Myers, Malik Taylor, Owen McIntyre, Samuel Barnes, Jean-Claude Olivier, and Terri Robinson, and spent three weeks at No. 1 on the US R&B chart and peaked at No. 2 on the US Billboard Hot 100 for four weeks. The song also reached No. 1 on Billboard's Top 40/Rhythm-Crossover airplay chart and was a moderate success on mainstream Top 40 radio, peaking at No. 21 in the spring of 1995 on Radio & Records CHR/Pop tracks chart. It was certified gold by the RIAA and sold 800,000 copies.  It features rapper Heavy D in the video and the song is regarded as the group's signature song. The song has a remix by Heavy D and samples the 1974 hit song "Mr. Magic" by Grover Washington, Jr. Bruno Mars has covered this song during his The Moonshine Jungle Tour. The bassline of this song was sampled from Minnie Riperton's "Baby, This Love I Have" which is the first song from her 1975 album Adventures in Paradise.

Charts

Weekly charts

Year-end charts

See also
List of number-one R&B singles of 1995 (U.S.)

References

1994 debut singles
Heavy D songs
1994 songs
Uptown Records singles
Song recordings produced by Trackmasters
Songs written by Jean-Claude Olivier
Songs written by Samuel Barnes (songwriter)
Songs written by Ali Shaheed Muhammad
Songs written by Heavy D
Soul for Real songs
Songs written by Hamish Stuart